Domenico Citro (born 17 September 1984) is an Italian footballer who played in the third and fourth tiers of football in Italy.

Biography
Born in Avellino, Campania, Citro started his career with Emilia side Parma, as first as a midfielder. In January 2004 he left for Serie C2 side Carrarese in co–ownership deal, where he spent  Serie C2 seasons. Parma also gave up the remain 50% registration rights to Carrarese in June 2005. He also spent 1 season with Serie C1 side Manfredonia, signed a reported 2–year contract.

He returned to Carrarese in August 2007.

International career
Citro capped for Italy at U15 level (the feeder team of U16 team, now U17 team). In November 2004 he received a call-up from Italy under-21 Lega Pro representative team against England C, but as unused bench. He also selected to annual Serie C Quadrangular Tournament, but for Serie C2/B U21 representative team in February 2005.

In June 2005, he was selected to Italy U21 B team which specially for 2005 Mediterranean Games, and for a preparation match against Serie D Best XI. He started both match against Morocco and Libya, but both replaced by Fabio Catacchini at second half.

References

External links
 Football.it Profile 
 FIGC National Team data 

Italian footballers
Parma Calcio 1913 players
Manfredonia Calcio players
Association football fullbacks
People from Avellino
1984 births
Living people
Competitors at the 2005 Mediterranean Games
Mediterranean Games competitors for Italy
Footballers from Campania
Sportspeople from the Province of Avellino